The Division of Balaclava was an Australian electoral division in the state of Victoria. The division was proclaimed in 1900, and was one of the original 65 divisions to be contested at the first federal election. It was named for the suburb of Balaclava, which in turn was named for a battlefield of the Crimean War. It was based in the wealthy inner southern suburbs of Melbourne, including Brighton and Sandringham. It was always a safe seat for the conservative parties, being held successively by Protectionist Party, Nationalist Party, United Australia Party and Liberal Party members. It was abolished and replaced by the Division of Goldstein in 1984.

Members

Election results

References 

1901 establishments in Australia
Constituencies established in 1901
Balaclava